In enzymology, a L-arabinose isomerase is an enzyme that catalyzes the chemical reaction

L-arabinose  L-ribulose

Hence, this enzyme has one substrate, L-arabinose, and one product, L-ribulose.

This enzyme belongs to the family of isomerases, specifically those intramolecular oxidoreductases interconverting aldoses and ketoses.  The systematic name of this enzyme class is L-arabinose aldose-ketose-isomerase. This enzyme participates in pentose and glucuronate interconversions.

This enzyme catalyses the conversion of L-arabinose to L-ribulose as the first step in the pathway of L-arabinose utilization as a carbon source.

Structural studies

References

Further reading
 
 

Protein families
EC 5.3.1
Enzymes of known structure